Cardioglossa escalerae is a species of frog in the family Arthroleptidae.
It is found in Cameroon, Central African Republic, Democratic Republic of the Congo, Equatorial Guinea, possibly Republic of the Congo, and possibly Gabon.
Its natural habitats are subtropical or tropical moist lowland forests, rivers, and heavily degraded former forest.
It is threatened by habitat loss.

References

Cardioglossa
Taxonomy articles created by Polbot
Amphibians described in 1903